Miami Beach Senior High School (Beach High, MBSH) is a secondary school located at 2231 Prairie Avenue Miami Beach, Florida, across from the Miami Beach Convention Center and Botanical Garden. It is located at the corner of Prairie Avenue and Dade Boulevard. The school is in Miami-Dade County and is part of the Miami-Dade County Public Schools, the fourth-largest school district in the United States. In addition, Miami Beach Senior High is the second oldest in Miami-Dade County (after Miami Senior High School). In 2009, the school was recognized as a magnet school.

In 2010, Miami Beach Senior High was recognized as an International Baccalaureate World School, meaning a select group of students get to attend a two-year program that allows them to graduate with a special diploma. The school was the first in the city of Miami Beach to receive the designation.

History
Miami Beach High opened in 1926. It was originally located at 1424 Drexel Avenue, in the heart of the South Beach district. It is one of the oldest high schools in Miami-Dade County, trailing only Miami Senior High School (1903). It was designed by August Geiger.

Carl Fisher provided the funds for the purchase of the land. For the first nine years of the school, it was named after Carl's mother, Ida M. Fisher. (Mrs. Fisher's middle initial was not "M", and the use of that letter was due to a typographer's error.  Carl did not care and was so pleased that the school had been named for his mother that he stated the incorrect letter did not make a difference to him.)

The school's first principal was C. C. Carson. The first class motto was: "Let us be known for our deeds." At that time, the school's nickname was the Typhoons, but this name was changed after its 1960 move to its new location at 2231 Prairie Avenue, about a block north of the South Beach district.

Under a forced desegregation order from the Florida Supreme Court, Miami Beach High underwent desegregation efforts.

Prior to the opening of North Miami Beach High School and Dr. Michael Krop High School, students from North Miami Beach were assigned to Miami Beach High School and Miami Norland High School.

The original building at 14th and Drexel Avenue is now part of the Fienberg-Fisher K-8 Center compound. The school is being renovated and new buildings added to replace the demolished ones.

In the late 1990s, Beach High adopted ID numbers for every student in the school along with school ID cards following an incident in 1995 with a gang member on campus who was not a student at the school. Soon after, every other school in Miami-Dade followed suit.

Recently

A new building that opened in 1999 was plagued with defects in the construction. Students were not permitted to use the lockers, and rain caused damage to school equipment.

Miami Beach Senior High School did not make AYP in 2006. Under the No Child Left Behind program, a school makes Adequate Yearly Progress (AYP) if it achieves the minimum levels of improvement determined by the state of Florida in terms of student performance and other accountability measures.

Since the 2006–2007 school year, the school has gone with a block schedule consisting of an A-Day (Odd - 1, 3, 5, 7) and B-Day (Even -  2, 4, 6, 8) on alternating school days. It consists of three classes before lunch under Secondary School Reform.

The 2007–2008 school year began with a new principal, Dr. Rosann Sidener, who improved the school's overall grade from a "D" to a "B" in her first year. This school year also saw the move from the old Beach High to the new Beach High in January 2008 with a new library and two new wings (2 and 3).

2008–2009 was the first year in which Miami Beach Sr. High students wore uniforms. In a two-to-one vote by some students' parents and guardians, the vote was ratified. Students now wear red or white shirts with the school logo or no logo, along with any shorts or jeans below the knees. The parents and faculty also voted to retain the Hi-Tide name and colors over going back to the Typhoons (former name).

Starting the 2009–2010 school year, Miami Beach Senior High is recognized as a magnet school, becoming the tenth magnet high school in Miami-Dade. Beach High was selected by the school district to apply for the MSAP grant, which is reserved for schools with high minority populations like Beach High, whose student body is 70% of Hispanic origin, compared to the state average of 25%.  The district agreed to sponsor Miami Beach High because there are no other magnet schools in the area, and because of the expected increase of school size to nearly 3,000 students as a result of new construction. Beach High will now be able to receive students beyond its attendance boundaries along with those who live within them.

In early 2012, Principal Sidener was named the 2012 Principal of the Year by the Florida Association of School Administrators.

In May 2012, the school held its prom next to an XXXotica Porn Convention at the Miami Beach Convention Center. The two events were held side-by-side, separated by a wall. The prom was held at the convention center to avoid students' drinking at hotels. It was the subject of national jokes, especially on the Jimmy Kimmel Live! late-night show.

Attendance zone
Areas of Miami Beach served by the school include Biscayne Point and  Normandy Island. Additionally the school serves Bal Harbour, Bay Harbor Islands, Indian Creek, North Bay Village, and Surfside.

Campus

Building 1
Building 1 includes the main office, counselors' offices (second floor), and the foreign language wing (second floor).

Buildings 2 and 3
Building 2 is made up of three floors and includes the library (first floor), 12 student restrooms (all floors), and a variety of different classrooms. Connected by an outdoor catwalk, Building 3 includes the Academy of Entrepreneurship (second floor), Academy of Visual and Performing Arts (first floor), and Academy of Information Technology (first and second floors) classrooms. Building 3 also includes the auditorium, as well as drama, chorus, band, guitar, and MIDI lab rooms.

Buildings 4 and 5
Formerly the 9 Building, Building 4 includes the Academy of Hospitality and Tourism classroom, three science classrooms, and two student restrooms. Located across from Building 4 and formerly the 4 Building, Building 5 was remodeled as part of the ongoing construction of the new Miami Beach Senior High. Building 5 houses the NJROTC and Academy of Information Technology in its two floors. It has various classrooms and computer labs, including a remodeled weight training room.

Buildings 6 and 7
Building 6 is a brand new wing that includes the physical ed classrooms, the SCSI room, and the gymnasium. Building 6 consists of two floors and also includes the Varsity and Junior Varsity locker rooms. Building 7 includes the Scholars' Academy wing. It has various classrooms throughout the two floors. Buildings 6 and 7 are located next to the cafeteria, which has six serving bays and a holding capacity of 1,100 people.

Football and soccer field
The football field is located behind Buildings 4 and 5 beside the back parking lot. It is currently not in use.

On May 28, 2010, it was announced that the Miami Dolphins and the National Football League had contributed towards the renovation of the field. A former alumnus, majority owner Stephen M. Ross, donated half of a $164,000 grant to the school. The field was expected to be renewed by that September, and named after Ross. His $82,000 grant matched an equal donation by the Dolphins, NFL Youth Football Fund and Local Initiatives Support Corporation.

The team plays its games at Flamingo Park's Memorial Field. It is expected to continue to play there, but could move to playing games at the school in the future.

Notable alumni

Athletics

Miami Beach High School has a gymnasium which is used for basketball, volleyball and wrestling. The baseball and soccer field is in Flamingo Park, located about a mile away from the school. The current athletic director is Edgar Botto. Miami Beach High offers these athletics:

Fall schedule
 Boys' and girls' cross country
 Junior varsity football
 Varsity football
 Boys' and girls' bowling
 Boys' and girls' golf
 Boys' and girls' swimming & diving
 Girls' junior varsity volleyball
 Girls' varsity volleyball

Winter schedule
 Boys' varsity basketball
 Boys' junior varsity basketball
 Girls' junior varsity basketball
 Girls' varsity basketball
 Boys' varsity soccer
 Girls' junior varsity soccer
 Girls' varsity soccer
 Boys' varsity wrestling

Spring schedule
 Boys' varsity baseball
 Girls' junior varsity softball
 Girls' varsity softball
 Boys' varsity tennis
 Girls' varsity tennis
 Boys' varsity track
 Girls' varsity track
 Boys' varsity water polo
 Girls' varsity water polo
Year-round
Boys' and girls' cheerleading team

Athletic achievements

The school's sports history and achievements are as follows:
 In the 1930s, the volleyball team won its first state championship. This was followed by district championships in 1990, 1998, 2002 and 2011.
 In 1946 and 1962, the basketball team won the state championship.
 In 1955, the football team was Gold Coast Champs.
 In 1965, Coach Chuck Fieldson was the Miami Heralds Coach of the Year.
 In the 1970s, the school won their first baseball championship, as well as two state runner-up finishes, all under future College Baseball Hall of Famer Skip Bertman. They also won the 2018 district championship. 
 In 1974, the football team reached the state title game but lost to Leon High School, in Tallahassee.
 In 1995, the football team became district champions for the first time after 10 years in 1986.
 In 1985, 1986, 1989, 1996, and 2000, the school's wrestling team were district champions.
 in 1988 the school's boys water polo team won its first of three state championships. 
 In 1990, 1993, 2011 and 2013, girls' cross country won district championships.
 In boys' soccer, Miami Beach Senior High has won the district titles in 1991, 1994, 1996, 1997, 1998, 1999, 2002, 2004, 2006, 2012 and 2013. They hold a couple of GMAC titles as well as Regional Championships. They were state runner-up in 1994. 
 In the 2006–2007 football season, the varsity football team finished with a 0–10 record overall (0–5 District), the worst record in school history. The school has gone through its losing ways, with a 7–23 record since the start of the 2004 football season and has lost 15 of their 17 football games dating to 2005. The football team won its first game since 2005 when it beat rival Miami High 10–7, and won the following game after that, finishing the 2007 season with two wins and the 2008 season with four wins.
 In 2008, Junior Francisco "Hunter" Becerra won the state championship in the diving competition.
 In 2019, MBSH cheerleaders brought home their first 3 trophies. They won first place and most spirit at a FCDA competition and ended third place in the nationals.
 In 2011, the Miami Beach Hi-Tide football team began 4–0 for the first time in the new millennium, which included three shutouts to begin the season  (Alonzo Mourning, North Miami, and Hialeah Gardens) and a 52–21 rout of rival Krop. The team has been led by Ricardo Louis, a top recruit in the county (ranked the No. 32 overall prospect in ESPNU Top 150 list and committed to Auburn). 
 In 2011 the girls' varsity volleyball team made MBSH history by winning districts and advancing to regional semifinals. The team also achieved a 16-0 undefeated season before district competitions began.
 In 2011 and 2012 the girls' cross country team were district champs, advancing to regional semifinals.
 In the 2011–2012 and 2012–2013 academic school year the Miami Beach football team made two consecutive playoff appearances, a first in the school's history. Under head coach Jason Kradman the Hi-Tides got approval from the Miami Beach city hall for a $2.4 million renovation of Flamingo Park football field. The field was expected to be first used in September 2013.
 The school's athletic rival is Miami Senior High but the school also has an informal athletic rivalry with Dr. Michael M. Krop High School and North Miami High School.
 Water polo is the most successful team in school history, with three state titles. Winning their first title in 1988.

Clubs

 5,000 Role Models
 Amnesty International
 Art Club
 Auditorium Stage Crew
 AVID
 Band/Orchestra
 Beach Patrol
 Beachcomber (newspaper)
 Best Buddies
 Brazilian Club
 Catholic Student Union
 Chess Club
 Chorus
 College Club
 D-FY-IT
 DECA
 DDC (Diversity Dance Crew)
 Drama Club
 Drum Corps
 Ecology Club
 Embryo (school magazine)
 FBLA (Future Business Leaders of America)
 FEA (Future Educators of America)
 Film Club
 Florida Public Service Association
 French Club
 Gay Straight Alliance
 Guitar
 HIP (Health Information Project)
 Hispanic Club
 In-School Student Chamber of Commerce
 Jewish Student Union
 Junior State of America
 Key Club
 Law Club
 Leo Club
 Miami Beach Senior High Alumni Association
 MOSS (Make Our Schools Safe)
 NJROTC (Naval Junior Officers Reserve Training Corps)
 Orchestra
 Psychology Club
 Quill & Scroll
 Robotics Club
 Rock Ensemble
 Scholas Initiative
 Scuba Club
 Speech and Debate Team
 Stage Crew
 STEAM Club
 Student Government
 UNICEF Club
 Yearbook

Club achievements
During the DECA 50th State Career Development Conference in 2010, Isabella Mongalo became the first person in Dade County to be elected a Florida DECA state officer when she was selected by voting delegates as Florida Vice-President.

In 2015, the Speech and Debate team were the runner-ups at CFL Nationals and won the FFL State Championship, both in Public Forum Debate. In 2021, the Speech and Debate team won the FFL State Championship in Public Forum Debate.

Honor societies
 English Honor Society - open to juniors and seniors who have consistently maintained a high average in English for a minimum of three years
 Italian Honor Society - open to juniors and seniors who have consistently maintained a high average in their years spent studying the language
 Hispanic Honor Society - open to juniors and seniors who have consistently maintained a high average in Spanish for a minimum of three years
 Mu Alpha Theta - math honor society
 NRHS Honor Society is part of a national organization.  Membership is based on scholarship, community service, leadership, and character.  To qualify, students must show a minimum of 20 verifiable hours of community service, and display strong leadership qualities.  Students meeting these requirements are interviewed and selected by members of the Faculty Council.
 Phi Beta Chi - science honor society, open to juniors and seniors who have consistently achieved 90s in science for a minimum of three years
 Quill and Scroll - writing honor society

Academies

Academy of Hospitality and Tourism: Launched in 1987, this prepares students for post-secondary education and careers through a theme-based, contextualized curriculum approach. It provides students with the requisite knowledge and skills for a successful career in one of the world's largest service industries, through a curriculum that provides an in-depth look at all aspects of tourism and hospitality, including coursework in business, geography, hospitality, and economics. The Academy of Hospitality & Tourism operates as a small learning community and is located in more than 110 high schools nationwide, including Miami Beach Senior High. It is the largest academy of the school, with nearly 200 students. Students go on annual familiarization trips to places such as Denver, Alaska, Orlando, and San Francisco.

Academy of Information Technology: For students in the 9th through 12th grades, this academy provides student internships, job shadowing opportunities, industry certifications in networking (A+ and C.I.W.), Adobe Dreamweaver, Flash and Photoshop, and in Microsoft's M.O.S. AOIT students also network with NAF (The National Academy Foundation) and community leaders who help guide the program and advocate on its behalf. This academy teaches the students about computer technology in general.

Academy of Visual and Performing Arts:  This offers program strands in drawing, painting, sculpture, photography, acting, music performance, music education, and music composition/sound engineering.

Academy of Digital Media: This offers program strands in film and television production, journalism and creative writing.

Academy of Marine and Environmental Science: This is offered to students interested in fields involving the environment or marine life.

Academy of Entrepreneurship: This is for students in grades 10–12 who wish to enhance their high school career with real-world experience in business and entrepreneurship. AOSBE introduces high school students to the global workplace and to many career opportunities available in accounting, business administration, finance, and entrepreneurship.

Academy of Education and Child Care: This offers opportunities and innovative ways to learn about the responsibilities of child care, and the future of the students with real-life situations.

AVID: Advancement Via Individual Determination is a fourth- through twelfth-grade system to prepare students in the academic middle for four-year college eligibility. It has a proven track record in bringing out the best in students, and in closing the achievement gap.

Scholars Academy:  During sophomore year, students in this academy are given the opportunity to apply for the International Baccalaureate program, which begins in the 11th grade and lasts until senior year.

Academics
The State's Accountability program grades a school by a complex formula that looks at both current scores and annual improvement on the Reading, Math, Writing and Science FCATs.

Films and productions shot at Beach High
An episode of MTV's MADE, a self-improvement reality television series, was shot at Miami Beach Senior High in early 2010, chronicling the Miami Beach Cheer Team. It is the third episode of the 11th season of the series. It premiered August 20, 2010, to mixed reviews.

In 1985, the opening scene of the movie Band of the Hand (directed by Paul Michael Glaser)  was filmed at MBSH.  An explosion scene was filmed by blowing out the wall to a classroom in the 100 wing.

Student demographics
The ethnic composition of the student body is: 
65% Hispanic
23% Non-Hispanic White
10% African American
2% Asian
N/A multiracial
N/A American Indian

The gender composition of the student body is: 
51% male
49% female

By the 1950s the majority of Miami Beach High's student body had become Jewish. At that time many non-Jewish parents began sending their children to other schools. In previous decades wealthy Christian students were the majority.

School renovations

The school is undergoing major renovations after 47 years at its second and current location on Prairie Avenue. The school demolished three old buildings (100–300 wings) while remodeling the zero wing (now Building 7) for the Scholars' Academy. Taking their place were two new buildings (Buildings 2 and 3), which opened in early 2008 along with a remodeled CAP office, new auditorium, a new dining facility and outdoor dining area with food court style service, a new gymnasium, black box theater, media center, science and computer labs. The first phase, which includes the already completed bus lane and parking lots, parent drop-off lane, auditorium, and new classrooms, was completed in late 2007.

The completed construction and remodeling of the school was finished a few weeks before school started. This includes a fourth facility (Building 6) which houses a new gym and cafeteria and opened in time for the start of the 2009–10 school year over the former area of the 100–400 wings. The new air-conditioned gym is twice the size of the old gym, which was demolished during the summer break of 2009 in time for the first day of school. A courtyard replaced the old gym's location. The new gym has an aerobics room, dance studio, and new locker rooms.

See also
 Miami-Dade County Public Schools
 Education in the United States

References

External links

 
 Miami Beach High School Alumni Association

Educational institutions established in 1926
Miami-Dade County Public Schools high schools
Buildings and structures in Miami Beach, Florida
Magnet schools in Florida
1926 establishments in Florida